The Lekwa Local Municipality is a Local Municipality in Mpumalanga, South Africa. The council consists of thirty members elected by mixed-member proportional representation. Fifteen councillors are elected by first-past-the-post voting in fifteen wards, while the remaining fifteen are chosen from party lists so that the total number of party representatives is proportional to the number of votes received. In the election of 1 November 2021 the African National Congress (ANC) lost its majority, winning thirteen seats.

Results 
The following table shows the composition of the council after past elections.

December 2000 election

The following table shows the results of the 2000 election.

March 2006 election

The following table shows the results of the 2006 election.

May 2011 election

The following table shows the results of the 2011 election.

August 2016 election

The following table shows the results of the 2016 election.

November 2021 election

The following table shows the results of the 2021 election.

Following the election, in which the African National Congress lost its majority for the first time, resulting in one of three hung councils in Mpumalanga, candidates from the Lekwa Community Forum were elected to the mayorship and speaker positions, while the Economic Freedom Fighters won the chief whip position.

References

Lekwa